Üllar Saaremäe (born November 23, 1969) is an Estonian actor, director, politician, and punk band singer.

Biography
Üllar Saaremäe was born 23 November 1969 in Kohtla-Järve.

He has two children from his relationship with actress Tiina Mälberg: Karl Robert and Marii Ingriin.

He was the creator and producer of the Estonian Punk Song Festival in 2008, for which he received the Estonian Volunteer of the Year national award.

Saaremäe is also involved in politics; he is a member of the conservative Pro Patria party and from  2009–2013 was a member of the Rakvere City Council. From 2017–2018, he was a member of the Kadrina Rural Municipality Council, and is a Lääne-Viru County electoral district member of the 14th Riigikogu since 2019.

Filmography

Films

Television

References

External links
 
Eesti Ekspress: Üllar Saaremäe - väge täis''
Teatrielamus saab alguse sisust
Eesti Naises
Eesti Päevalht:Üllar Saaremäe: minu punt on Rakvere teater
Tartu Oskar Lutsu nimeline Linnaraamatukogu

1969 births
Living people
Estonian male film actors
Estonian male stage actors
Estonian male television actors
Estonian Academy of Music and Theatre alumni
Members of the Riigikogu, 2019–2023
Isamaa politicians
People from Kohtla-Järve
Recipients of the Order of the White Star, 4th Class
21st-century Estonian politicians
20th-century Estonian male actors
21st-century Estonian male actors